Robert Bonnaventure (8 August 1920 – 24 January 2015) was a French racing cyclist. He rode in the 1947 and 1948 Tour de France.

References

External links

1920 births
2015 deaths
French male cyclists
Sportspeople from Haute-Saône
Cyclists from Bourgogne-Franche-Comté